Tournament Golf is a 1983 video game published by Avalon Hill.

Gameplay
Tournament Golf is a game in which players make use of their own skills in a golf simulation.

Reception
Russell Sipe reviewed the game for Computer Gaming World, stating that: "TG is highly recommended for any golfer with  Apple II."

References

External links
Review in InCider
Review in Electronic Games
Article in Family Computing

1983 video games
Apple II games
Apple II-only games
Avalon Hill video games
Golf video games
Video games developed in the United States